Pietro Zeno (died 17 January 1345) was the Venetian captain and bailiff of Negroponte (1331–33) and one of the leaders of the Smyrniote crusade (1343–45).

In May–June 1332, an Aydinid Turkish fleet of 380 ships under Umur Bey attacked Negroponte. Zeno bought them off with a large tribute. On 18 July 1332, Doge Francesco Dandolo charged Zeno and Pietro da Canale with arranging an anti-Turkish alliance. By the end of the year the Naval League, "a union, society and league for the discomfiture of the Turks and the defence of the true faith", had been formally constituted. In 1334 Zeno took command of the league's fleet of twenty galleys and on 14 September defeated the large fleet of Yakhshi, emir of Karasi, off Adramyttion.

In September 1343, the Venetian Grand Council elected Zeno captain of the flotilla of five galleys which it was sending to assist the crusade against Aydinid-held Smyrna. Although the crusade was a great naval success and Smyrna was taken, Zeno was killed by Umur Bey's forces in an ambush while he and the other crusader leaders, including Henry of Asti, were attempting to celebrate a mass in a church in the no-man's-land between the battle lines.

Zeno's son, also Pietro Zeno, was a famous diplomat in the eastern Mediterranean.

Notes

References

Sources

 

1345 deaths

Year of birth unknown
Republic of Venice admirals
Military personnel killed in action
Christians of the Crusades
14th-century Venetian people
Baili of Negroponte
Smyrniote crusades